Peter Hansen may refer to:

Peter Hansen (painter) (1868–1928), Danish painter
Peter Hansen (UN) (born 1941), Danish relief worker
Peter Andreas Hansen (1795–1874), Danish astronomer
Peter Hansen (actor) (1921–2017), American actor
Peter Hansen (politician), New Hampshire politician
Peter Hansen (rower) (born 1921), Danish rower
Peter O. Hansen (1818–1895), translator of the Book of Mormon into Danish
Peter Reinhard Hansen (born 1968), Danish economist at the Stanford University
Peter Hansen (SS officer), SS soldier, commander of the 29th and 15th Waffen Grenadier Division of the SS
 Peter Hansen (American football), American football coach at Stanford University
 Peter Allan Hansen (1944–2012), Danish classical philologist
 Peter J. Hansen (born 1956), American animal scientist

See also
Peter Hanson (born 1977), Swedish golfer
Peter E. Hanson (1845–1914), American businessman and politician
 Peter Hanson, a passenger on United Airlines Flight 175